James Corbett Senter (June 10, 1892 – March 1968) was a college American football player.

Georgia Tech

American football
Senter was a prominent end for John Heisman's Georgia Tech Golden Tornado of the Georgia Institute of Technology. he was selected for Tech's All-Era team of the Heisman era. He was selected All-Southern in 1914 and 1915.

Senter was a starter for the 1916 Georgia Tech team which, as one writer wrote, "seemed to personify Heisman". Senter played and scored in the 222–0 defeat of Cumberland University.

Baseball
He also pitched on the Georgia Tech Yellow Jackets baseball team.

Cornell
In 1918, he completed his ground school training in the school of aeronautics at Cornell.

References

American football ends
All-Southern college football players
Georgia Tech Yellow Jackets football players
Georgia Tech Yellow Jackets baseball players
Baseball pitchers
1892 births
1968 deaths
Players of American football from Virginia
People from Clintwood, Virginia
Baseball players from Virginia